San Agustín Yatareni  is a town and municipality in Oaxaca in southwestern Mexico. The municipality covers an area of 33.17 km². 
It is part of the Centro District in the Valles Centrales region.
As of 2005 the municipality had a total population of 3,176.

References

Municipalities of Oaxaca